This is a list of township-level divisions of the province of Shandong, People's Republic of China (PRC). After province, prefecture, and county-level divisions, township-level divisions constitute the formal fourth-level administrative divisions of the PRC. There are a total of 1,858 such divisions in Shandong, divided into 500 subdistricts, 1,091 towns, one ethnic town, and 266 townships. This list is divided first into the prefecture-level cities then the county-level divisions.

Jinan

Changqing District
Subdistricts:
Wenchang Avenue Subdistrict, Guyunhu Subdistrict, Ping'an Subdistrict, Wufengshan Subdistrict

Towns:
Guide, Xiaoli, Wande, Zhangxia, Mashan

The only township is Shuangquan Township

Huaiyin District
Subdistricts:
Zhenxing Avenue Subdistrict, Zhongdahuaishu Subdistrict, Daode Avenue Subdistrict, Xishichang Subdistrict, Wuligou Subdistrict, Yingshi Avenue Subdistrict, Qingnian Park Subdistrict, Nanxinzhuang Subdistrict, Duandian North Road Subdistrict, Zhangzhuang Road Subdistrict, Kuangshan Subdistrict, Meilihu Subdistrict

Towns:
Wujiabao, Duandian

Jiyang District
Subdistricts:
Jiyang Subdistrict, Jibei Subdistrict

Towns:
Duoshi, Sungeng, Qudi, Renfeng, Cuizhai, Taiping, Huihe, Xinshi

Licheng District
Subdistricts:
Shanda Road Subdistrict, Hongjialou Subdistrict, Dongfeng Subdistrict, Quanfu Subdistrict, Suncun Subdistrict, Juyehe Subdistrict

Towns:
Zhonggong, Ganggou, Liubu, Guodian, Dongjia, Tangwang, Yaoqiang, Wangsheren, Huashan, Xiying, Caishi

Lixia District
Subdistricts:
Jiefang Road Subdistrict, Qianfoshan Subdistrict, Baotuquan Subdistrict, Quancheng Road Subdistrict, Daminghu Subdistrict, Dongguan Subdistrict, Wendong Subdistrict, Jianxin Subdistrict, Dianliu Subdistrict, Yanshan Subdistrict, Yaojia Subdistrict, Longdong Subdistrict, Zhiyuan Subdistrict

Shizhong District, Jinan
Subdistricts:
Daguanyuan Subdistrict, Ganshiqiao Subdistrict, Silicun Subdistrict, Weijiazhuang Subdistrict, Erqi Subdistrict, Qilishan Subdistrict, Liulishan Subdistrict, Shunyu Road Subdistrict, Luoyuan Subdistrict, Wangguanzhuang Subdistrict, Shungeng Subdistrict, Baimashan Subdistrict, Qixian Subdistrict, Shiliulihe Subdistrict, Xinglong Subdistrict, Dangjia Subdistrict, Dougou Subdistrict

Tianqiao District
Subdistricts:
Wuyingshan Subdistrict, Tianqiao East Avenue Subdistrict, Beicun Subdistrict, Nancun Subdistrict, Dikou Road Subdistrict, Beitan Subdistrict, Zhijinshi Subdistrict, Baohua Subdistrict, Guanzhaying Subdistrict, Weibei Road Subdistrict, Yaoshan Subdistrict, Beiyuan Subdistrict, Luokou Subdistrict

Towns:
Sangzidian, Daqiao Subdistrict

Zhangqiu District

Subdistricts:
Mingshui Subdistrict, Shuangshan Subdistrict, Zaoyuan Subdistrict, Longshan Subdistrict, Bucun Subdistrict, Shengjing Subdistrict, Puji Subdistrict, Xiuhui Subdistrict, Xiangsongzhuang Subdistrict, Wenzu Subdistrict, Guanzhuang Subdistrict, Gaoguanzhai Subdistrict, Baiyunhu Subdistrict, Ningjiabu Subdistrict, Caofan Subdistrict

Towns:
Diao, Duozhuang, Huanghe

Gangcheng District
The only subdistrict is Aishan Subdistrict

Towns:
Ezhuang, Huangzhuang, Lixin, Xinzhuang

Laiwu District
Subdistricts:
Fengcheng Subdistrict, Zhangjiawa Subdistrict, Gaozhuang Subdistrict, Pengquan Subdistrict

Towns:
Kou, Yangli, Fangxia, Niuquan, Miaoshan, Xueye, Dawangzhuang, Zhaili, Yangzhuang, Chayekou

The only township is Hezhuang Township

Pingyin County
Subdistricts:
Yushan Subdistrict, Jinshui Subdistrict
Towns:
Dong'e, Xiaozhi, Kongcun, Hongfanchi, Meigui, Ancheng Township

Shanghe County
Subdistricts:
Xushang Subdistrict, Yuhuangmiao Subdistrict

Towns:
Yinxiang, Huairen, Longsangsi, Zhenglu, Jiazhuang

Townships:
Sunji Township, Shahe Township, Hanmiao Township, Zhangfang Township, Baiqiao Township

Qingdao

Chengyang District
Subdistricts:
Chengyang Subdistrict, Xiazhuang Subdistrict, Liuting Subdistrict, Jihongtan Subdistrict, Shangma Subdistrict, Hongdao Subdistrict, Hetao Subdistrict, Xifuzhen Subdistrict

Jimo District

Subdistricts:
Huanxiu Subdistrict, Chaohai Subdistrict, Tongji Subdistrict, Bei'an Subdistrict, Longshan Subdistrict, Longquan Subdistrict, Aoshanwei Subdistrict, Wenquan Subdistrict

Towns:
Tianheng, Jinkou, Lingshan, Duanbolan, Yifengdian, Lancun, Daxin

Laoshan District
Subdistricts:
Zhonghan Subdistrict, Shazikou Subdistrict, Wanggezhuang Subdistrict, Beizhai Subdistrict

Licang District
Subdistricts:
Zhenhua Road Subdistrict, Yongqing Road Subdistrict, Yong'an Road Subdistrict, Xinghua Road Subdistrict, Xingcheng Road Subdistrict, Licun Subdistrict, Hushan Road Subdistrict, Fushan Road Subdistrict, Jiushui Road Subdistrict, Xiangtan Road Subdistrict, Loushan Subdistrict

Shibei District
Subdistricts:
Liaoning Road Subdistrict, Yan'an Road Subdistrict, Huayang Road Subdistrict, Dengzhou Road Subdistrict, Ningxia Road Subdistrict, Dunhua Road Subdistrict, Liaoyuan Road Subdistrict, Hefei Road Subdistrict, Xiaogang Subdistrict, Dagang Subdistrict, Jimo Road Subdistrict, Taidong Subdistrict, Zhenjiang Road Subdistrict, Hongshanpo Subdistrict, Tong'an Road Subdistrict, Fushan New Area Subdistrict, Fuxin Road Subdistrict, Hailun Road Subdistrict, Jiaxing Road Subdistrict, Xinglong Road Subdistrict, Shuiqinggou Subdistrict, Luoyang Road Subdistrict, Hexi Subdistrict

Shinan District
Subdistricts:
Central Hong Kong Road Subdistrict, Badaxia Subdistrict, Taixi Subdistrict, Yunnan Road Subdistrict, Zhongshan Road Subdistrict, Guanhai Road Subdistrict, Jiangsu Road Subdistrict, Jinkou Road Subdistrict, Badaguan Subdistrict, Zhanshan Subdistrict, Jinhu Road Subdistrict, Badahu Subdistrict, Jinmen Road Subdistrict, Zhuhai Road Subdistrict

Xihai'an
Formerly known as Huangdao District.

Subdistricts:
Huangdao Subdistrict, Xin'an Subdistrict, Xuejiadao Subdistrict, Lingzhushan Subdistrict, Changjiang Road Subdistrict, Hongshiya Subdistrict, Zhushan Subdistrict, Zhuhai Subdistrict, Yinzhu Subdistrict, Lingshanwei Subdistrict, Tieshan Subdistrict, Binhai Subdistrict

Towns:
Langya, Poli, Dachang, Dacun, Liuwang, Wangtai, Zhangjialou, Haiqing, Baoshan, Zangnan, Liwuguan

Jiaozhou
Subdistricts:
Fu'an Subdistrict, Zhongyun Subdistrict, Beiguan Subdistrict, Sanlihe Subdistrict, Yunxi Subdistrict, Yinghai Subdistrict, Jiaodong Subdistrict

Towns:
Madian, Ligezhuang, Puji, Zhangying, Licha, Jiaoxi, Yanghe, Jiulong, Ducun, Jiaobei

Laixi
Subdistricts:
Shuiji Subdistrict, Wangcheng Subdistrict, Longshui Subdistrict, Meihuashan Subdistrict, Binhe Road Subdistrict, Guhe Subdistrict

Towns:
Sunshou, Jiangshan, Xiagezhuang, Yuanshang, Rizhuang, Nanshu, Hetoudian, Dianbu, Liquanzhuang, Wubei, Malianzhuang

Pingdu
Subdistricts:
Dongge Subdistrict, Liyuan Subdistrict, Tonghe Subdistrict, Fengtai Subdistrict, Baishahe Subdistrict
Towns:
Guxian, Renzhao, Nancun, Liaolan, Cuijiaji, Mingcun, Tianzhuang, Xinhe, Dianzi, Dazeshan, Jiudian, Yunshan

Others: 
Pingdu Export-Oriented Processing Industries District

Binzhou

Bincheng District
Subdistricts:
Shizhong Subdistrict, Shixi Subdistrict, Beizhen Subdistrict, Shidong Subdistrict, Pengli Subdistrict, Xiaoying Subdistrict, Binbei Subdistrict, Liangcai Subdistrict, Dudian Subdistrict, Shahe Subdistrict, Lize Subdistrict

Towns:
Jiuzhen, Baoji

Townships:
Shangji Township, Qinhuangtai Township

Boxing County
Subdistricts:
Chengdong Subdistrict, Jinqiu Subdistrict, Bochang Subdistrict

Towns:
Caowang, Xingfu, Chenhu, Hubin, Dianzi, Lüyi, Chunhua, Pangjia, Qiaozhuang

Huimin County
Subdistricts:
Sunwu Subdistrict, Wudingfu Subdistrict, Hefang Subdistrict

Towns:
Shimiao, Sangluoshu, Zijiao, Huji, Lizhuang, Madian, Weiji, Qinghe, Jianglou, Xindian, Danianchen, Zaohuli

Wudi County
Subdistricts:
Difeng Subdistrict, Haifeng Subdistrict

Towns:
Shuiwan, Jieshishan, Xiaobotou, Chengkou, Mashanzi, Chewang, Liubao, Shejia

Townships:
Xinyang Township, Xixiaowang Township

Yangxin County
Towns:
Yangxin, Shangdian, Wendian, Heliu, Zhaiwang, Liupowu

Townships:
Sudian Township, Shuitapo Township, Yanghu Township

Zhanhua County
Subdistricts:
Fuguo Subdistrict, Fuyuan Subdistrict

Towns:
Xiawa, Gucheng, Fengjia, Botou, Dagao, Huangsheng, Binhai

Townships:
Xiahe Township, Liguo Township

Others:
Haifang

Zouping County
Subdistricts:
Daixi Subdistrict, Huangshan Subdistrict, Gaoxin Subdistrict

Towns:
Changshan, Weiqiao, Xidong, Haosheng, Linchi, Jiaoqiao, Handian, Sunzhen, Jiuhu, Qingyang, Mingji, Taizi, Matou

Dezhou

Decheng District
Subdistricts:
Xinhu Subdistrict, Xinhua Subdistrict, Tianqu Subdistrict, Dongdi Subdistrict, Yunhe Subdistrict, Songguantun Subdistrict, Changhe Subdistrict

Towns:
Ertun, Huangheya, Zhaohu

Townships:
Taitousi Township, Yuanqiao Township

Laoling
Subdistricts:
Shizhong Subdistrict, Hujia Subdistrict, Yunhong Subdistrict, 
Guojia Subdistrict

Towns:
Yang'an, Zhuji, Huangjia, Dingwu, Huayuan, Zhengdian, Hualou, Kong

Townships:
Xiduan Township, Dasun Township, Tieying Township, Zhaitoubao Township

Yucheng
The only subdistrict is Shizhong Subdistrict

Towns:
Lun, Fangsi, Zhangzhuang, Xindian, Anren, Xinzhai, Liangjia

Townships:
Litun Township, Shiliwang Township, Juzhen Township

Ling County
Subdistricts:
Ande Subdistrict, Linji Subdistrict

Towns:
Zhengjiazhai, Mi, Songjia, Weiwangzhuang, Shentou, Zi, Qiansun, Bianlin, Yidukou, Dingzhuang

The only township is Yuji Township

Linyi County
Subdistricts:
Xingdong Subdistrict, Hengyuan Subdistrict, Liupan Subdistrict

Towns:
Linyi, Linnan, Deping, Linzi, Xinglong, Mengsi, Cuijia, Lihewu

The only township is Su'an Township

Ningjin County
Towns:
Ningjin, Chaihudian, Changguan, Duji, Baodian, Daliu, Dacao, Xiangya, Shiji

Townships:
Zhangdazhuang Township, Liuyingwu Township

Pingyuan County
Subdistricts:
Longmen Subdistrict, Taoyuan Subdistrict

Towns:
Wangfenglou, Qiancao, Encheng, Wangmiao, Wanggaopu, Zhanghua, Jiaozhan

Townships:
Fangzi Township, Wangdagua Township, Santang Township

Qihe County
Towns:
Yancheng, Biaobaisi, Jiaomiao, Zhaoguan, Zhu'e, Renliji, Pandian, Huguantun, Xuanzhangtun

Townships:
Huadian Township, Antou Township, Maji Township, Liuqiao Township, Dahuang Township

Qingyun County
The only subdistrict is Bohai Road Subdistrict

Towns:
Qingyun, Changjia, Shangtang, Cuikou

Townships:
Yanwu Township, Dongxindian Township, Zhongding Township, Xuyuanzi Township

Wucheng County
The only subdistrict is Guangyun Subdistrict

Towns:
Wucheng, Laocheng, Luquantun, Haowangzhuang

Townships:
Yangzhuang Township, Lijiahu Township, Jiamaying Township

Xiajin County
Subdistricts:
Yincheng Subdistrict, Beicheng Subdistrict

Towns:
Nancheng, Suliuzhuang, Xinshengdian, Leiji, Zhengbaotun, Baimahu, Dongliguantun, Songlou, Xiangzhaozhuang, Shuangmiao

Townshisp:
Dukouyi Township, Tianzhuang Township

Dongying

Dongying District
Subdistricts:
Wenhui Subdistrict, Huanghe Road Subdistrict, Dongcheng Subdistrict, Xindian Subdistrict, Shengli Subdistrict, Shengyuan Subdistrict

Towns:
Niuzhuang, Liuhu, Shikou, Longju

Hekou District
The only subdistrict is Hekou Subdistrict

Towns:
Yihe, Xianhe, Gudao

Townships:
Xinhu Township, Taiping Township, Liuhe Township

Kenli District

Subdistricts:
Kenli Subdistrict, Xinglong Subdistrict

Towns:
Shengtuo, Haojia, Yong'an, Huanghekou, Dongji

Guangrao County
Towns:
Guangrao, Dawang, Daozhuang, Shicun, Dingzhuang, Lique

Townships:
Damatou Township, Xiliuqiao Township, Huaguan Township, Chenguan Township

Lijin County
Towns:
Lijin, Beisong, Yanwo, Chenzhuang, Tingluo

Townships:
Mingji Township, Beiling Township, Hutan Township, Diaokou Township

Heze

Mudan District
Subdistricts:
Dongcheng Subdistrict, Xicheng Subdistrict, Nancheng Subdistrict, Beicheng Subdistrict, Mudan Subdistrict, Danyang Subdistrict, Yuecheng Subdistrict, Dianhutun Subdistrict, Helou Subdistrict, Wanfu Subdistrict

Towns:
Shatu, Wudian, Wangjietun, Huanggang, Dusi, Gaozhuang, Xiaoliu, Licun, Malinggang, Anxing, Dahuangji, Lüling

Townshisp:
Huji Township, Huangzhen Township

Cao County

Subdistricts:
Caocheng Subdistrict, Panshi Subdistrict, Qinghe Subdistrict, Zhengzhuang Subdistrict, Niji Subdistrict

Towns:
Zhuangzhai, Pulianji, Qingguji, Taoyuanji, Hanji, Zhuanmiao, Guyingji, Weiwan, Houji Hui Town, Suji, Sunlaojia, Gedianlou, Liangditou, Ancailou, Shaozhuang, Wangji, Qinggangji, Changleji, Daji, Wulou

Townships:
Louzhuang Township, Niuhongmiao Township

Chengwu County
Towns:
Chengwu, Datianji, Tiangongmiao, Wenshangji, Nanluji, Boleji, Goucunji, Baifutu, Sunsi, Jiunüji

Townships:
Dangji Township, Zhanglou Township

Dingtao County
Towns:
Dingtao, Chenji, Rangu, Zhangwan, Huangdian, Menghai, Maji

Townships:
Fangshan Township, Nanwangdian Township, Bandi Township, Dutang Township

Dongming County
Towns:
Chengguan, Dongmingji, Liulou, Luquan, Matou, Sanchunji, Datun

Townships:
Wushengqiao Township, Caiyuanji Township, Xiaojing Township, Shawo Township, Changxingji Township, Jiaoyuan Township

Juancheng County
Towns:
Juancheng, Shiji, Hongchuan, Jiucheng, Yanshi, Jishan, Lijinshitang, Dongkou, Linpu, Penglou

Townships:
Zuoying Township, Danian Township, Yinma Township, Fenghuang Township, Fuchun Township, Zhengying Township

Juye County
Subdistricts:
Fenghuang Subdistrict, Yongfeng Subdistrict

Towns:
Longgu, Dayi, Liulin, Zhangfeng, Daxieji, Dushan, Qilin, Hetaoyuan, Tianzhuang, Taiping, Wanfeng, Taomiao, Dongguantun, Tianqiao, Yingli

Shan County
Subdistricts:
Beicheng Subdistrict, Nancheng Subdistrict, Yuanyi Subdistrict, Dongcheng Subdistrict

Towns:
Guocun, Huanggang, Zhongxing, Gaoweizhuang, Xuzhai, Caitang, Zhuji, Lixinzhuang, Fugang, Laihe, Shilou, Yanglou, Zhangji, Longwangmiao, Litianlou, Xieji

Townships:
Gaolaojia Township, Caozhuang Township

Yuncheng County
Subdistricts:
Yunzhou Subdistrict, Tangta Subdistrict

Towns:
Huang'an, Yangzhuangji, Houyanji, Wu'an, Guotun, Dinglichang, Yuhuangmiao, Chengtun, Suiguantun, Zhangying, Pandu, Shuangqiao, Tangmiao, Nanzhaolou, Huangduiji

Townships:
Huangji Township, Liji Township, Zhangluji Township, Shuibao Township, Chenpo Township

Jining

Rencheng District
Subdistricts:
Xuzhuang Subdistrict, Liuxing Subdistrict, Guanghe Subdistrict, Liying Subdistrict, Nanzhang Subdistrict, Jincheng Subdistrict, Xianying Subdistrict

Towns:
Nianlipu, Changgou, Jiezhuang, Shiqiao

Others:
Yankuang Group Jidong New Village

Shizhong District, Jining
Subdistricts:
Guhuai Subdistrict, Jiyang Subdistrict, Fuqiao Subdistrict, Yuehe Subdistrict, Nanfan Subdistrict, Guanyinge Subdistrict, Anju Subdistrict, Tangkou Subdistrict

The only town is Yutun

Qufu
Subdistricts:
Lucheng Subdistrict, Shuyuan Subdistrict

Towns:
Wucun, Yaocun, Lingcheng, Xiaoxue, Nanxin, Shizhuang

Townships:
Wangzhuang Township, Dongzhuang Township, Xizou Township, Fangshan Township

Yanzhou
Subdistricts:
Gulou Subdistrict, Longqiao Subdistrict, Jiuxianqiao Subdistrict, Wangyin Subdistrict, Huangtun Subdistrict

Towns:
Da'an, Xinyi, Yandian, Xinyan, Caohe, Xinglongzhuang, Xiaomeng

Zoucheng
Three subdistricts:
Gangshan Subdistrict, Qianquan Subdistrict, Fushan Subdistrict

Thirteen towns:
Xiangcheng, Chengqian, Dashu, Beisu, Zhongxindian, Tangcun, Taiping, Shiqiang, Yishan, Kanzhuang, Zhangzhuang, Tianhuang, Guoli

Jiaxiang County
Towns:
Jiaxiang, Zhifang, Liangbaosi, Wolongshan, Tuanli, Macun, Jintun, Dazhanglou

Townships:
Laosengtang Township, Huanggai Township, Wanzhang Township, Maji Township, Mandong Township, Zhongshan Township, Mengguji Township

Jinxiang County
Towns:
Jinxiang, Yangshan, Huji, Xiaoyun, Jishu, Wangpi, Sima, Yushan, Mamiao

Townships:
Huayu Township, Buji Township, Gaohe Township, Xinglong Township

Liangshan County
Subdistricts:
Liangshan Subdistrict, Shuipo Subdistrict

Towns:
Xiaolukou, Hangang, Quanpu, Yangying, Hangai, Guanyi, Xiao'anshan, Maying, Shouzhangji, Heihumiao, 

Townships:
Zhaogudui Township, Dalukou Township

Sishui County
Subdistricts:
Sihe Subdistrict, Jihe Subdistrict

Towns:
Quanlin, Xingcun, Zhegou, Jinzhuang, Miaoguan, Zhongce, Yangliu, Sizhang

Townships:
Shengshuiyu Township, Dahuanggou Township, Gaoyu Township

Weishan County
Subdistricts:
Xiazhen Subdistrict, Zhaoyang Subdistrict

Towns:
Hanzhuang, Hebei, Huancheng, Nanyang, Luqiao, Fucun, Liuzhuang

Townships:
Weishandao Township, Liangcheng Township, Mapo Township, Gaolou Township, Zhanglou Township, Zhaomiao Township, Xiping Township

Wenshang County
Subdistricts:
Wenshang Subdistrict, Zhongdu Subdistrict

Towns:
Nanzhan, Nanwang, Ciqiu, Yinsi, Guolou, Kangyi, Yuanzhuang

Townships:
Yiqiao Township, Liulou Township, Guocang Township, Yangdian Township, Juntun Township, Baishi Township

Yutai County
Towns:
Guting, Qinghe, Yucheng, Wanglu, Zhanghuang, Wangmiao, Lige

Townships:
Tangma Township, Laozhai Township, Luotun Township

Liaocheng

Dongchangfu District
Subdistricts: 
Gulou Subdistrict, Liuyuan Subdistrict, Xinqu Subdistrict, Huxi Subdistrict, Daokoupu Subdistrict, Yansi Subdistrict, Fenghuang Subdistrict, Beicheng Subdistrict, Dongcheng Subdistrict, Jiangguantun Subdistrict

Towns:
Houying, Shazhen, Tangyi, Liangshui, Douhutun, Zhengjia, Zhangluji, Yuji

Townships:
Xuying Township, Zhulaozhuang Township

Chiping District
Subdistricts:
Zhenxing Subdistrict, Xinfa Subdistrict

Towns:
Lepingpu, Fengguantun, Caitun, Boping, Dulang, Hantun

Townships:
Hanji Township, Guangping Township, Hutun Township, Wenchen Township, Jiazhai Township, Yangguantun Township, Hongguantun Township, Xiaozhuang Township

Linqing
Subdistricts:
Qingnian Road Subdistrict, Xinhua Road Subdistrict, Xianfeng Subdistrict, Daxinzhuang Subdistrict

Towns:
Songlin, Laozhaozhuang, Weiwan, Liugaizi, Bachalu, Panzhuang, Yandian, Tangyuan

Townships:
Jinhaozhuang Township, Daiwan Township, Shangdian Township

Dong'e County
Subdistricts:
Tongcheng Subdistrict, Xincheng Subdistrict

Towns:
Liuji, Niujiaodian, Daqiao, Gaoji, Jianglou, Guguantun, Yaozhai

Townships:
Yushan Township, Chenji Township

Gaotang County
Subdistricts:
Yuqiuhu Subdistrict, Huili Subdistrict, Renhe Subdistrict

Towns:
Liangcun, Yinji, Qingping, Guhe, Sanshilipu, Bolisi

Townships:
Yangtun Township, Zhaozhaizi Township, Jiangdian Township

Guan County
Subdistricts:
Qingquan Subdistrict, Chongwen Subdistrict, Yanzhuang Subdistrict

Towns:
Jia, Sang'e, Liulin, Qingshui, Donggucheng, Beiguantao, Dianzi

Townships:
Xiedian Township, Liangtang Township, Dingyuanzhai Township, Xinji Township, Fanzhai Township, Ganguantun Township, Lanwo Township, Wanshan Township

Shen County
Subdistricts:
Yanta Subdistrict, Shenting Subdistrict, Shenzhou Subdistrict, Donglu Subdistrict

Towns:
Zhanglu, Chaocheng, Guancheng, Gucheng, Dazhangjia, Guyun, Shibalipu, Yandian, Dongduzhuang, Wangfeng, Yingtaoyuan, Hedian, Meizhong, Weizhuang, Zhangzhai, Dawangzhai

Townships:
Zudian Township, Xuzhuang Township, Wangzhuangji Township, Shiziyuan Township

Yanggu County
Subdistricts:
Bojiqiao Subdistrict, Qiaorun Subdistrict, Shizilou Subdistrict

Towns:
Yanlou, Echeng, Qiji, Anle, Dingshui, Shifo, Litai, Shouzhang, Shiwuliyuan, Zhangqiu

Townships:
Guodiantun Township, Dabu Township, Xihu Township, Gaomiaowang Township, Jindouying Township

Linyi

Hedong District
Subdistricts:
Jiuqu Subdistrict, Zhimadun Subdistrict, Meibu Subdistrict, Xiangsong Subdistrict, Taiping Subdistrict, Tangtou Subdistrict, Fenghuangling Subdistrict

Towns:
Chonggou, Tanghe, Bahu, Zhengwang

The only township is Liudianzi Township

Lanshan District, Linyi
Subdistricts:
Lanshan Subdistrict, Yinqueshan Subdistrict, Jinqueshan Subdistrict, Nanfang Subdistrict

Towns:
Baishabu, Zaogoutou, Niucheng, Yitang, Machanghu, Liguan, Zhubao, Xinqiao, Fangcheng, Wanggou

Luozhuang District
Subdistricts:
Luozhuang Subdistrict, Fuzhuang Subdistrict, Shengzhuang Subdistrict, Tangzhuang Subdistrict, Shuangyuehu Subdistrict, Ceshan Subdistrict, Gaodu Subdistrict, Luoxi Subdistrict

Fei County
The only subdistrict is Feicheng Subdistrict

Towns:
Shangye, Xuezhuang, Tanyi, Zhutian, Liangqiu, Xinzhuang, Mazhuang, Huyang, Shijing

Townships:
Datianzhuang Township, Nanzhangzhuang Township

Junan County
Towns:
Shizilu, Tuanlin, Dadian, Fangqian, Pingshang, Xiangdi, Banquan, Zhubian, Wentuan, Zhuanggang, Tingshui, Shilianzi, Lingquan, Yanbin, Laopo, Zhulu

Townships:
Daokou Township, Xianggou Township

Lanling County

The sole subdistrict is Bianzhuang Subdistrict.
Towns:
Dazhongcun, Lanling, Changcheng, Moshan, Shenshan, Chewang, Shangyan, Xiangcheng, Xinxing, Nanqiao, Zhuangwu, Lucheng, Kuangkeng, Jinling, Luzuo

The sole township is Xiacun Township.

Linshu County
Towns:
Linshu, Jiaolong, Daxing, Shimen, Caozhuang, Nangu, Zhengshan, Baimao, Qingyun, Yushan, Diantou

The only township is Zhucang Township

Mengyin County
The only subdistrict is Mengyin Subdistrict

Towns:
Changlu, Daigu, Tanbu, Duozhuang, Gaodu, Yedian, Taoxu, Jiepai

Townships:
Liancheng Township, Jiuzhai Township

Pingyi County
Towns:
Pingyi, Zhongcun, Wutai, Baotai, Bailin, Bianqiao, Difang, Tongshi, Wenshui, Liuyu, Zhengcheng, Baiyan, Linjian, Fengyang

Townships:
Ziqiu Township, Weizhuang Township

Tancheng County
Towns:
Tancheng, Matou, Chongfang, Lizhuang, Chudun, Yangji, Huangshan, Gangshang, Gaofengtou, Miaoshan, Shadun

Townships:
Shengli Township, Xincun Township, Huayuan Township, Guichang Township, Honghua Township, Quanyuan Township

Yinan County
Towns:
Jiehu, Andi, Sunzu, Shuanghou, Qingtuo, Zhangzhuang, Zhuanbu, Gegou, Yangjiapo, Dazhuang, Xinji, Puwang, Hutou, Sucun, Tongjing, Yiwen

The only township is Mamuchi Township

Yishui County
Towns:
Yishui, Mazhan, Gaoqiao, Xujiahu, Huangshanpu, Yaodianzi, Zhuge, Cuijiayu, Sishilibao, Yangzhuang, Xiawei, Shagou, Gaozhuang

Townships:
Daotuo Township, Quanli Township, Longjiaquan Township, Quanzhuang Township, Fuguanzhuang Township, Yuandongtou Township

Rizhao

Donggang District
Subdistricts:
Rizhao Subdistrict, Shijiu Subdistrict, Kuishan Subdistrict, Qinlou Subdistrict, Beijing Road Subdistrict

Towns:
Heshan, Liangcheng, Taoluo, Xihu, Chentuan, Nanhu, Sanzhuang

Lanshan District, Rizhao
Subdistricts:
Lanshantou Subdistrict, Andongwei Subdistrict

Towns:
Beikuo, Hushan, Jufeng, Gaoxing, Houcun, Huangdun

The only township is Qiansandao Township

Ju County
Towns:
Chengyang, Zhaoxian, Yanzhuang, Xiazhuang, Liuguanzhuang, Qiaoshan, Xiaodian, Zhonglou, Longshan, Dongguan, Fulaishan, Lingyang, Dianziji, Changling, Anzhuang, Qishan, Luohe, Sangyuan

Townships:
Zhailihe Township, Guozhuang Township, Kushan Township

Wulian County
Towns:
Hongning, Jietou, Chaohe, Xumeng, Yuli, Wanghu, Kouguan, Zhongzhi, Gaoze

Townships:
Shichang Township, Hubu Township, Songbai Township

Tai'an

Daiyue District
Subdistricts:
Zhoudian Subdistrict, Tianping Subdistrict, Beijipo Subdistrict

Towns:
Shankou, Zhuyang, Fan, Jiaoyu, Culai, Manzhuang, Xiazhang, Daolang, Huangqian, Dawenkou, Mazhuang, Fangcun, Liangzhuang

Townships:
Xiagang Township, Huamawan Township

Taishan District
Subdistricts:
Daimiao Subdistrict, Caiyuan Subdistrict, Taiqian Subdistrict, Shanggao Subdistrict, Xujialou Subdistrict

Towns:
Shengzhuang, Qiujiadian

The only township is Dajinkou Township

Feicheng
Subdistricts:
Xincheng Subdistrict, Laocheng Subdistrict, Wangguadian Subdistrict, Yiyang Subdistrict

Towns:
Chaoquan, Hutun, Shiheng, Taoyuan, Wangzhuang, Anzhan, Sunbo, Anzhuang, Bianyuan, Wenyang

Xintai
Subdistricts:
Qingyun Subdistrict, Xinwen Subdistrict, Xinfu Subdistrict

Towns:
Dongdu, Xiaoxie, Zhai, Quangou, Yangliu, Guodu, Xizhangzhuang, Tianbao, Loude, Yucun, Gongli, Guli, Shilai, Fangcheng, Liudu, Wennan, Longyan

The only township is Daijiazhuang Township

Dongping County
Subdistricts:
 Dongping, Pengji, Zhoucheng,

Towns:
 Shahezhan,  Laohu, Yinshan, Banjiudian, Jieshan Township, Dayang Township, Timen Township, Xinhu Township, Daimiao Township

Townships:
Shanglaozhuang Township, Jiuxian Township

Ningyang County
Subdistricts:
Wenmiao Subdistrict (文庙街道), Baxianqiao Subdistrict (八仙桥街道)

Towns:
Sidian, Dongshu, Fushan, Gangcheng, Jiangji, Ciyao, Huafeng, Geshi, Heshan, Dongzhuang

Townships:
The only township is Xiangyin Township

Weifang

Fangzi District
Subdistricts:
Fenghuang Subdistrict, Fang'an Subdistrict, Fangcheng Subdistrict, Jiulong Subdistrict

Towns:
Huangqibao, Taibaozhuang

Hanting District
Subdistricts:
Hanting Subdistrict, Kaiyuan Subdistrict, Gudi Subdistrict, Yangzi Subdistrict, Gaoli Subdistrict, Zhuli Subdistrict, Dajiawa Subdistrict

Kuiwen District
Subdistricts:
Dongguan Subdistrict, Dayu Subdistrict, Liyuan Subdistrict, Nianlibao Subdistrict, Weizhou Road Subdistrict, Beifan Subdistrict, Guangwen Subdistrict, Xincheng Subdistrict, Qingchi Subdistrict

Weicheng District
Subdistricts:
Chengguan Subdistrict, Nanguan Subdistrict, Xiguan Subdistrict, Beiguan Subdistrict, Yuhe Subdistrict, Wangliu Subdistrict

Anqiu
Subdistricts:
Xing'an Subdistrict, Xin'an Subdistrict

Towns:
Jingzhi, Linghe, Guanzhuang, Dasheng, Zhaoge, Shibuzi, Shidui, Zheshan, Huiliang, Wushan, Jinzhongzi

Changyi

Subdistricts:
Kuiju Subdistrict, Duchang Subdistrict, Weizi Subdistrict

Towns:
Liutuan, Longchi, Buzhuang, Yinma, Beimeng, Xiaying

Gaomi
Subdistricts:
Chaoyang Subdistrict, Liquan Subdistrict, Mishui Subdistrict

Towns:
Baicheng, Xiazhuang, Jiangzhuang, Damoujia, Kanjia, Jinggou, Chaigou

Qingzhou
Subdistricts:
Wangfu Subdistrict, Yidu Subdistrict, Yunmenshan Subdistrict

Towns:
Mihe, Wangfen, Miaozi, Shaozhuang, Gaoliu, Heguan, Dongxia, Tanfang, Huanglou

Shouguang
Subdistricts:
Shengcheng Subdistrict, Wenjia Subdistrict, Gucheng Subdistrict, Luocheng Subdistrict, Sunjiaji Subdistrict

Towns:
Hualong, Yingli, Taitou, Tianliu, Shangkou, Houzhen, Jitai, Daotian, Yangkou

Zhucheng
Subdistricts:
Mizhou Subdistrict, Longdu Subdistrict, Shunwang Subdistrict

Towns:
Zhigou, Jianyue, Shiqiaozi, Xiangzhou, Changcheng, Baichihe, Xinxing, Linjiacun, Huanghua,  Taolin

Changle County

Subdistricts:
Baodu Subdistrict, Baocheng Subdistrict, Zhuliu Subdistrict, Chengnan Subdistrict, Wutu Subdistrict

Towns:
Qiaoguan, Tangwu, Honghe, Yingqiu

Linqu County
Subdistricts:
Chengguan Subdistrict, Dongcheng Subdistrict, Yeyuan Subdistrict, Xinzhai Subdistrict

Towns:
Wujing, Sitou, Jiushan, Longgang, Liushan, Yishan

Weihai

Huancui District
Subdistricts:
Huancuilou Subdistrict, Jingyuan Subdistrict, Zhudao Subdistrict, Qiayuan Subdistrict, Tianhe Subdistrict, Huangguan Subdistrict, Fenglin Subdistrict, Xifan Subdistrict

Towns:
Zhangcun, Yangting, Wenquan, Gushan, Sunjiatuan, Poyu, Qiaotou, Caomiaozi, Chucun

Wendeng District

Subdistricts:
Longshan Road Subdistrict, Tianfu Road Subdistrict, Huanshan Road Subdistrict

Towns:
Wendengying, Dashuibo, Zhangjiachan, Gaocun, Zeku, Houjia, Songcun, Zetou, Xiaoguan, Gejia, Mishan, Jieshi

Others: Wendeng Development Zone

Rongcheng
Subdistricts:
Ningjin Subdistrict, Gangwan Subdistrict, Taoyuan Subdistrict, Wanglian Subdistrict, Dongshan Subdistrict, Chishan Subdistrict, Yatou Subdistrict, Chengxi Subdistrict, Xunshan Subdistrict, Laoshan Subdistrict

Towns:
Lidao, Chengshan, Buliu, Gangxi, Xiazhuang, Yaxi, Yinzi, Tengjia, Datuan, Shangzhuang, Hushan, Renhe

Rushan
The only subdistrict is Chengqu Subdistrict

Towns:
Xiacun, Rushankou, Haiyangsuo, Baishatan, Dagushan, Nanhuang, Fengjia, Xiachu, Wuji, Yuli, Yazi, Zhuwang, Rushanzhai, Xujia

Yantai

Fushan District
Subdistricts:
Qingyang Subdistrict, Fuxin Subdistrict, Guxian Subdistrict, Dajijia Subdistrict, Bajiao Subdistrict, Fulaishan Subdistrict Menlou Subdistrict

Towns:
Gaotuan, Zhanggezhuang, Huili, Zangjiazhuang

Laishan District
Subdistricts:
Huanghai Road Subdistrict, Chujia Subdistrict, Binhai Road Subdistrict, Laishan Subdistrict, Jiejiazhuang Subdistrict, Mashan Subdistrict, Yuangezhuang Subdistrict

Muping District
Subdistricts:
Ninghai Subdistrict, Wenhua Subdistrict, Yangma Island Subdistrict

Towns:
Guanshui, Wuning, Dayao, Jianggezhuang, Longquan, Yulindian, Shuidao, Jugezhuang, Gaoling, Wanggezhuang

Zhifu District
Subdistricts:
Xiangyang Subdistrict, Dongshan Subdistrict, Yuhuang Subdistrict, Tongshen Subdistrict, Fenghuangtai Subdistrict, Qishan Subdistrict, Baishi Subdistrict, Zhifu Island Subdistrict, Huangwu Subdistrict, Zhichu Subdistrict, Shihuiyao Subdistrict, Xingfu Subdistrict

Penglai District
Subdistricts:
Dengzhou Subdistrict, Zijingshan Subdistrict, Xingang Subdistrict, Penglaige Subdistrict, Nanwang Subdistrict, Nanchangshan Subdistrict

Towns:
Liujiagou, Chaoshui, Daliuhang, Xiaomenjia, Daxindian, Cunliji, Beigou, Tuoji

Townships:
Beichangshan Township, Heishan Township, Daqindao Township, Xiaoqindao Township, Nanhuangcheng Township, Beihuangcheng Township

Haiyang
Subdistricts:
Fangyuan Subdistrict, Dongcun Subdistrict, Fengcheng Subdistrict

Towns:
Liugezhuang, Panshidian, Guocheng, Xujiadian, Facheng, Xiaoji, Xingcun, Xin'an, Shierlidian, Dayanjia, Zhuwu

Others:
Haiyang Export-Oriented Processing Industries District

Laiyang
Subdistricts:
Chengxiang Subdistrict, Guliu Subdistrict, Longwangzhuang Subdistrict, Fenggezhuang Subdistrict

Towns:
Muyudian, Tuanwang, Xuefang, Yangjun, Jiangtuan, Wandi, Zhaowangzhuang, Tangezhuang, Bolinzhuang, Heluo, Lügezhuang, Gaogezhuang, Dakuang, Shanqiandian

Laizhou
Subdistricts:
Wenchang Road Subdistrict, Yong'an Road Subdistrict, Sanshan Island Subdistrict, Chenggang Road Subdistrict, Wenfeng Road Subdistrict

Towns:
Shahe, Zhuqiao, Guojiadian, Jincheng, Pinglidian, Yidao, Chengguo, Hutouya, Zhacun, Xiaqiu, Tushan

Longkou
Subdistricts:
Donglai Subdistrict, Longgang Subdistrict, Xinjia Subdistrict, Xufu Subdistrict, Dongjiang Subdistrict

Towns:
Huangshanguan, Beima, Lutou, Xiadingjia, Qijia, Shiliang, Langao, Zhuyouguan

Qixia
Subdistricts:
Cuizhan Subdistrict, Zhuangyuan Subdistrict, Songshan Subdistrict

Towns:
Guanli, Shewobo, Tangjiabo, Taocun, Tingkou, Sikou, Sujiadian, Yangchu, Xicheng, Guandao, Miaohou

Zhaoyuan
Subdistricts:
Luofeng Subdistrict, Quanshan Subdistrict, Mengzhi Subdistrict, Wenquan Subdistrict

Towns:
Xinzhuang, Canzhuang, Jinling, Biguo, Linglong, Zhangxing, Daqinjia, Xiadian, Bushan, Qishan

Zaozhuang

Shanting District
The only subdistrict is Shancheng Subdistrict

Towns:
Dianzi, Xiji, Sangcun, Beizhuang, Chengtou, Xuzhuang, Shuiquan, Fengmao

The only township is Fucheng Township

Shizhong District, Zaozhuang
Subdistricts:
Zhongxin Avenue Subdistrict, Getabu Subdistrict, Kuangqu Subdistrict, Wenhua Road Subdistrict, Longshan Road Subdistrict, Guangming Road Subdistrict

Towns:
Shuiguo, Mengzhuang, Qicun

Townships:
Yong'an Township, Xiwangzhuang Township

Tai'erzhuang District
The only subdistrict is Yunhe Subdistrict

Towns:
Pizhuang, Zhangshanzi, Nigou, Jiantouji, Malantun

Xuecheng District
Subdistricts:
Lincheng Subdistrict, Xingren Subdistrict, Xingcheng Subdistrict

Towns:
Shagou, Zhouying, Zouwu, Taozhuang, Changzhuang, Zhangfan

Yicheng District
Subdistricts:
Tanshan Subdistrict, Wulin Subdistrict

Towns:
Gushao, Yinping, Dige, Liuyuan, Eshan

Tengzhou
Subdistricts:
Jinghe Subdistrict, Longquan Subdistrict, Beixin Subdistrict, Shannan Subdistrict

Towns
Dongshahe, Hongxu, Nanshahe, Dawu, Binhu, Jisuo, Xigang, Jiangtun, Baogou, Zhangwang, Guanqiao, Chaihudian, Yangzhuang, Mushi, Jiehe, Longyang, Dongguo

Zibo

Boshan District
Subdistricts:
Chengdong Subdistrict, Chengxi Subdistrict

Towns:
Yucheng, Baita, Xiajiazhuang, Shantou, Badou, Gushan, Shima, Beiboshan, Nanboshan, Yuanquan, Chishang

Linzi District
Subdistricts:
Wenshao Subdistrict, Xuegong Subdistrict, Xindian Subdistrict, Jixia Subdistrict, Qiling Subdistrict

Towns:
Qidu, Huangcheng, Jingzhong, Zhutai, Wutai, Jinling, Nanwang, Fenghuang

The only township is Bianhe Township

Zhangdian District
Subdistricts:
Chezhan Subdistrict, Gongyuan Subdistrict, Xingyuan Subdistrict, Heping Subdistrict, Kefan Subdistrict, Tiyuchang Subdistrict, Shiqiao Subdistrict, Sibaoshan Subdistrict

Towns:
Mashang, Nanding, Fengshui, Hutian, Fujia, Zhongbu, Weigu, Fangzhen

Zhoucun District
Subdistricts:
Sichou Road Subdistrict, Dajie Subdistrict, Qingnian Road Subdistrict, Yong'an Subdistrict, Chengbei Road Subdistrict

Towns:
Beijiao, Nanjiao, Wangcun, Mengshui

Zichuan District
Subdistricts:
Banyang Road Subdistrict, Songling Road Subdistrict, Shangcheng Road Subdistrict, Zhonglou Subdistrict

Towns:
Chengnan, Kunlun, Cicun, Lingzi, Shangjia, Heiwang, Zihe, Dongping, Xihe, Longquan, Zhaili, Luocun, Hongshan, Shuangyang, 
Taihe

Townships:
Ezhuang Township, Zhangzhuang Township

Gaoqing County
Towns:
Tian, Qingcheng, Gaocheng, Heilizhai, Tangfang, Changjia, Huagou, Zhaodian, Muli

Huantai County
Towns:
Suozhen, Qifeng, Xingjia, Tianzhuang, Jingjia, Maqiao, Chenzhuang, Xincheng, Zhoujia, Tangshan, Guoli

Yiyuan County
The only subdistrict is Lishan Subdistrict

Towns:
Nanma, Lucun, Dongli, Yuezhuang, Xili, Dazhangzhuang, Zhongzhuang, Zhangjiapo, Yanya, Shiqiao, Nanlushan

References

External links

 
Shandong
Townships